Paul Jujhar Soren   is an Indian politician. He was a Member of Parliament, representing Purnea cum Santhal Paragnas in the Lok Sabha the lower house of India's Parliament as a member of the Jharkhand Party.

References

Lok Sabha members from Bihar
Jharkhand Party politicians
India MPs 1952–1957
Possibly living people
Year of birth missing